The Brocket Arms   is a country inn in Ayot St. Lawrence, Hertfordshire, England. According to Historic England, the timber-framed building is probably early sixteenth century, although an earlier date has been claimed.

The Brocket Arms is near Old St Lawrence Church, and, was supposedly "the monastic quarters" for the church until the Reformation. Another claim is that it was a "stop off point for pilgrims" on their way to St Albans Abbey.

Hauntings
It is said to be haunted by a priest who was tried and hanged in the building. Others say it is of a monk who hanged himself at the inn.

See also
 Brocket Hall

References

External links
Official site

Buildings and structures in Ayot St Lawrence
Timber framed pubs in Hertfordshire
Hotels in Hertfordshire
Pubs in Welwyn Hatfield (district)
Grade II listed pubs in Hertfordshire
Reportedly haunted locations in the East of England